Rudyard "Ruddy" Spencer,  (born 23 February 1944) is a Jamaican former politician. A member of the Jamaica Labour Party (JLP), Spencer was first appointed to the Senate of Jamaica in 1993. Spencer was also a member of parliament for South East Clarendon for 18 years. He won every election he contested until his retirement from politics in February 2020.

Early life
Spencer was born on 23 February 1944 in Grange Hill, Westmoreland, Jamaica. He was educated in Medgar Evers College, City University of New York, and graduated from Cornell University with a degree in industrial relations.

Career
In 1993, Spencer was appointed to the Senate of Jamaica. From 1995 to 1997, he was the Leader of the Opposition Business in the Senate. From 2002 to 2020, he was a member of parliament for South East Clarendon. Spencer served as the Minister of Health in Jamaica from 2007 to 2012. In 2016, he was appointed as Minister of Finance and the Public Service. Spencer also directed the Jamaica Confederation of Trade Unions and was a member of the Caribbean Congress of Labour. In February 2020, Spencer announced his retirement from electoral politics. Members of both the JLP and the PNP paid tribute to Spencer for his years of service. While awaiting his appointment to the Jamaican embassy in Berlin, Germany, Spencer served as deputy chairman of the Industrial Disputes Tribunal (IDT).

Recognition
In 1995, Spencer was awarded the Order of Distinction (Officer Class), and promoted to Commander Class in 2014 for "more than 20 years of distinguished service to parliament".

References

Living people
Members of the House of Representatives of Jamaica
Government ministers of Jamaica
1944 births
Ministers of Health of Jamaica
Jamaican trade unionists